The Jean Bart was a 90-gun Suffren class ship of the line of the French Navy, named in honour of Jean Bart.

She took part in the Siege of Sevastopol (1854–1855) and the Battle of Kinburn (1855).

In 1856, she was fitted with a steam engine. From 1864, she was used as a training ship. She was renamed to Donawerth in September 1868, and was finally scrapped as Cyclope in 1886.

References

 Jean-Michel Roche, Dictionnaire des Bâtiments de la flotte de guerre française de Colbert à nos jours, tome I

Ships of the line of the French Navy
Suffren-class ships of the line
Training ships
1852 ships